Hathkadi is a 1995 Hindi-language action film directed by T. Rama Rao starring Govinda, Shilpa Shetty and Shakti Kapoor.

Plot 
Assistant Commissioner of Police, Suraj Chauhan (Govinda) is an honest and diligent police officer. These qualities in him are instilled in him due to the presence of corrupt politicians and police officers like the Home Minister Bhavani Shankar (Shakti Kapoor), Suraj's Deputy Inspector General (Kiran Kumar). Suraj has a brother (Arun Govil), who is a crime reporter for the Indian Times. Home Minister Bhavani Shankar goes to a function held by an adoption center for orphan girls. There he encounters a pretty girl and instantly feels infatuated with her. He asks the DIG to ask the Mayor's wife to bring her to him since the Mayor's wife is the owner of the adoption center. At first, the Mayor's wife resists and says no, but when the DIG threatens to tell the truth about her past endeavours about dealing with prostitutes to her husband, she agrees. That night, when the Mayor's wife brings the girl to Bhavani Shankar, little does he know that Arun is on an assignment for his newspaper. Arun discovers and records a video of Bhavani Shankar raping the same girl from the adoption center. The next night, Arun goes to see the Mayor only to show him the misdeed that Home Minister Bhavani Shankar has committed. Filled with anger and disgust, the Mayor and Arun head to the police department to have Home Minister Bhavani Shankar arrested for this. But unfortunately, the Mayor's wife overhears them and informs the DIG about this. On the way to the police station, Arun and the Mayor are blocked and then ruthlessly killed by Chakku Pande (Puneet Issar), a special hired goon of Bhavani Shankar. Suraj is enraged and aggrieved at the loss of his brother and swears to avenge his death. As Suraj finally starts coming more in contact with Bhavani Shankar, he realizes his bad character and that Bhavani Shankar is the one behind his brother's killing. After that, Suraj goes to Chakku Pande to get him to confess the killing he did according to the order given by Bhavani Shankar. But Chakku Pande denies it and thus is beaten up by Suraj. Chakku Pande gets sent to jail by Suraj until he decides to confess to his crime. Then one night, Bhavani Shankar hires a few goons to have Chakku Pande killed. But Chakku Pande survives due to Suraj and the police  and claims he will protest against Bhavani Shankar. To Suraj's surprise, when he takes Chakku Pande to a huge public function to confess this truth, Chakku Pande puts the blame on Suraj. After that, the lights go out and a gunshot is heard. When the lights come back on, Chakku Pande is dead and a possible suspect is seen running away through the crowd by Suraj. Presuming that Suraj is the killer (which he is not), the evil police officers of Bhavani Shankar arrest Suraj and send him to jail for the murder of Chakku Pande. But when he reaches jail, he is surprised to see that he has a lookalike, Rajnikant(also Govinda). Rajnikant is a simple man with strong positive morals who came to jail because he killed a man who tried to rape his wife. And when Rajnikant realizes that the evil politicians put Suraj in jail in the first place, he suggests that Suraj and Rajnikant can switch places so that Suraj can leave as Rajnikant, since Rajnikant's sentence is almost over. And from here onwards, starts a fun and action filled story of how Suraj and Rajnikant join forces to finally accomplish Suraj's goal of avenging his brother.

Cast 
Govinda as ACP Suraj Chauhan / Rajnikant (Dual Role)
Madhoo as Rani 
Shilpa Shetty as Neha
Arun Govil as Arun Chauhan
Shakti Kapoor as Bhavani Shankar 
Kiran Kumar as DIG Vijaykumar
Tej Sapru as Inspector Prabhakar
Alok Nath as Chief Minister
Satyen Kappu as Chandraprakash 
Puneet Issar as Chakku Pandey, the killer
Vijayalalitha as Lata 
Laxmikant Berde as Pyarelal 
Jayalalitha as Sub-inspector Phoolan Devi
Vishwajeet Pradhan as Baccha Thakur
Ishrat Ali as Guruji of Bhavani Shankar

Music 
"Aanan Faanan Aanan Faanan" – Swarnalatha, Abhijeet, Anu Malik
"Jawani Me Aag Lagi" – Chithra K S, Anu Malik
"Mera Chandi JaisPa Tan" – Swarnalatha, Anu Malik
"Amma Amma" – Abhijeet, Swarnalatha
"Janta Hu Manta Hu" – S P Balasubramaniam, Chithra K S
"Lml Baba Lml" – Alisha Chinai, Anu Malik

External links

References

1995 films
1995 action films
1990s Hindi-language films
Films directed by T. Rama Rao
Films scored by Anu Malik
Indian action films